Dawid Stefanus Lubbe Snyman (born 5 July 1949) is a former South African rugby union player and coach.

Playing career
Snyman represented the Free State schools at two consecutive Craven Week tournaments. After school and completing his military training he enrolled at Stellenbosch University. In 1971, before playing provincial rugby, he was selected for the Springboks to tour Australia. Although he did not play in any test matches during the tour, being selected for the team made him only the third player, after JC van der Westhuizen and Danie Craven  to represent the Springboks before playing for a province. He made his provincial debut for Western Province later during the 1971 season.

Snyman's test debut was in 1972 at Ellis Park against the touring English side captained by John Pullin. Playing flyhalf, Snyman scored all the point for the Springboks in the 9–18 defeat to the English. During September to November 1972, Snyman toured with Gazelles, a South African under-24 team, to Argentina. Snyman played ten test matches for the Springboks, scoring 24 points, including one try.  He also played in twelve tour matches, scoring sixty-two points.

Test history

Coaching career
In 1982 Snyman was appointed as the head coach of Western Province, with Charlie Cockrell as his assistant. During his tenure as head coach Western Province won the Currie Cup five times in a row from 1982 to 1986. In 1989, with Hennie Bekker as his assistant coach, Western Province shared the Currie Cup with Northern Transvaal.

See also
List of South Africa national rugby union players – Springbok no. 453

References

1949 births
Living people
South African rugby union players
South Africa international rugby union players
Western Province (rugby union) players
Alumni of Grey College, Bloemfontein
Stellenbosch University alumni
Rugby union fly-halves
Rugby union fullbacks
Rugby union players from Johannesburg